People's Education Society University (PESU), formerly PES Institute of Technology (PESIT), is a state private university in Bengaluru, India. Established in 1988, it is focused on the following educational areas: Engineering, Management, Law, Economics, Commerce, Architecture, Design, Psychology, Arts, Medicine and Life Sciences. The institution offers both foundation courses in these areas, as well as specializations, with a Bachelors, Master or PhD degree. The college was established as PES University in 2013, as a state private university. There are 3 campuses under PES University in Bangalore, Ring Road Campus located at Banashankari 3rd stage outer ring road Bangalore, Electronic City Campus located at Electronic City hosur road Bangalore and Hanmumanth Nagar Campus located at Banashankari 1st stage Bangalore.

History
PESU is managed by the People‘s Education Society (PES), which was founded in 1972, in a rented gymnasium in Bengaluru, with around 40 students. PES currently manages over 45 educational programs in Karnataka and neighbouring Andhra Pradesh, with a total of over 18,000 students. 

PESU was started as PESIT in 1988 as the first engineering college under the PES group of institutions. The college was affiliated to Visvesvaraya Technological University, Belagavi and later became an autonomous college under VTU. The college was established as PES University in 2013 and renamed as PES University.

PES University
PES University was established as a state private university by PES University Act, 2012 (Karnataka Act 16 of 2013) in 2013, to establish and incorporate in the State of Karnataka a university of unitary nature in the private sector to promote and undertake the advancement of university education in Engineering, Medicine, Pharmacy, Science, Arts, Social Science, Computer Applications, Humanities and Management.

There are three campuses under PES University:  
 PES University, Ring Road Campus
 PES University, Electronic City Campus
 PES University, Hanumantha Nagar Campus (formed by the merger of PES College of Pharmacy and PES Degree College)

Academic profile

Admission criteria

PESU admits 40% of its students to undergraduate courses based on their Karnataka CET ranks and 60% of its students based on PESSAT (the university's own entrance test) ranks. PESU also admits students under a Management quota, which may not place any merit requirements. There is a lateral entry scheme in place, by which students holding diploma degrees can directly enter the second year of study in engineering. On graduating, students receive a Bachelor of Technology degree.

Students are admitted to postgraduate courses based on their GATE test scores  as well as on their Post Graduate Karnataka CET scores. Upon graduating, they receive a Master of Technology degree.

Faculty and research 

Crucible Of Research and Innovation (CORI) is a multi-disciplinary research center at PES University. It was inaugurated by Dr. C. N. R. Rao (former Director, Indian Institute of Science) on 7 February 2010. It has research facilities and a set of dedicated research staff who carry out research in various areas.

Centre for Intelligent Systems (CIS) is a research center at PES University which researches on topics like Control Systems, Speech, Image and Signal Processing, Robotics, Artificial Intelligence and Low Power VLSI design. Selected students do internships in the PES Innovation Lab (formerly Microsoft Innovation Lab) on the university campus.

Rankings

The university was ranked 83rd for engineering in India by National Institutional Ranking Framework (NIRF) in 2021

References

External links 

PES University

All India Council for Technical Education
Affiliates of Visvesvaraya Technological University
Engineering colleges in Bangalore
Engineering universities and colleges in India
1971 establishments in Mysore State
Educational institutions established in 1988